Alejandro Altuna (born 19 January 1992) is an Argentine professional footballer who plays as a midfielder for Flandria.

Career
Altuna joined Sportivo Patria following a spell with Belgrano. He scored one goal in eight games during the 2014 Torneo Federal A, which preceded his departure in January 2015 to Deportivo Madryn. His debut against Ferro Carril Oeste on 22 March 2015 was the first of twenty-six appearances for the club. Altuna was on the move again after agreeing to join Flandria of Primera B Metropolitana in 2016. They were promoted in his first season, in which he featured nineteen times whilst netting once. On 11 August 2017, Altuna joined fellow Primera B Nacional team San Martín; who also won promotion in his opening campaign.

Altuna was released by Quilmes in June 2020.

Career statistics
.

Honours
Flandria
Primera B Metropolitana: 2016

References

External links

1992 births
Living people
Argentine footballers
Argentine expatriate footballers
Sportspeople from Córdoba Province, Argentina
Association football midfielders
Torneo Federal A players
Primera B Metropolitana players
Primera Nacional players
Serie D players
Argentine Primera División players
Sportivo Patria footballers
Deportivo Madryn players
Flandria footballers
San Martín de Tucumán footballers
Quilmes Atlético Club footballers
Nueva Chicago footballers
A.C. Este players
Argentine expatriate sportspeople in Italy
Expatriate footballers in Italy